Mezőkovácsháza  is a town in Békés County, in the Southern Great Plain region of south-east Hungary.

Geography

Notable residents
 György Simonka (1974-), politician
 József Balázs (1984-), footballer
 Zoltán Farkas, musician

Twin towns – sister cities

Mezőkovácsháza is twinned with:
 Moneasa, Romania
 Praid, Romania
 Semlac, Romania 
 Vinga, Romania

References

External links

 in Hungarian
Civic Union of Mezőkovácsháza | Mezőkovácsházi Polgári Egyesület

Populated places in Békés County